Banksia Latrobe Secondary College was a public, co-educational high school located in Heidelberg West, Victoria, Australia. It was closed at the end of 2011, being replaced by Charles La Trobe College. From the 1980s, it underwent a large transformation and a series of amalgamations.

About the school
Banksia Latrobe Secondary College is set in the midst of residential streets, surrounded by parks and gardens just 10 kilometres North-East of Melbourne's CBD. The college has facilities that are a result of a refurbishment of the former Heidelberg High School, and a merger of the Latrobe and Banksia Secondary Colleges in 2008. Specialist areas such as engineering and instrumental music have specialist facilities and equipment. Other facilities include two full sized basketball stadia, three synthetic grass tennis courts, a horticulture centre, a large canteen and a 203-seat theatre. The college owns and operates two buses. In recent years more and more wall space has been used to display the artwork currently produced by students. The college offers the use of its facilities by the wider community seven days a week and most nights.

The AIZ has been implemented at Banksia Latrobe SC. AIZ is an initiative of the Northern Metropolitan Region of the Department of Education and Early Childhood Development. This pioneer project is focused on improving teacher practice and significantly enhancing literacy and numeracy achievement levels in the 80 participating schools. With support and training provided by leading experts in school improvement, literacy and numeracy education, and assessment practices, nominated Learning Leaders are taking charge of embedding change in their schools.

In 1984, the Deaf Facility was established at Heidelberg High School as a pilot project. It commenced in Term Two with Teachers of the Deaf, Interpreters, Notetakers, and 14 Deaf students. These students came from various settings throughout the state including Victorian College for the Deaf, Glendonald School for the Deaf and students on Visiting Teacher Services. Students travelled from all over Melbourne and country Victoria, and due to the success of this Facility, other primary and secondary facilities have been established throughout Victoria.

History
Education in the greater Heidelberg area has undergone a large transformation in the past twenty years. Heidelberg High School was opened in 1956. The  nearby Heidelberg Technical School was opened in 1955. Heidelberg Girls' High School was opened in 1957, and Rosanna High School opened soon after. As a result of declining enrolments in the area, due to an ageing population, amalgamations occurred, which saw Heidelberg Girls' HS become Waterdale High School and Rosanna High School become Latrobe High School. Eventually, Waterdale High School closed, and in 1989, Heidelberg High School amalgamated with Heidelberg Technical School and Latrobe High School to become Banksia Secondary College. The college was refurbished and re-opened on the old Heidelberg High School site in 1991.

2008 saw Latrobe Secondary College (formerly Macleod Technical School) amalgamate with Banksia Secondary College (formerly Heidelberg High School) to form Banksia Latrobe Secondary College.

The school was closed and in 2012 the City of Banyule acquired part of the former Banksia LaTrobe Secondary College in Bellfield to allow for high-end residential infill development and also enable revenue to be generated for Council. The Bellfield Urban Design Guidelines were developed and adopted by Council in February 2019.

References

External links
Banksia Latrobe Secondary College website

Public high schools in Victoria (Australia)
Educational institutions established in 1954
1954 establishments in Australia
Heidelberg, Victoria
Educational institutions disestablished in 2011
Demolished buildings and structures in Melbourne
2011 disestablishments in Australia